The Gotthard Road Tunnel in Switzerland runs from Göschenen in the canton of Uri at its northern portal, to Airolo in Ticino to the south, and is  in length below the St Gotthard Pass, a major pass of the Alps. At time of construction, in 1980, it was the longest road tunnel in the world; it is currently the fifth-longest. Although it is a motorway tunnel, part of the A2 from Basel to Chiasso, it consists of only one bidirectional tube with two lanes.

After  from the northern portal there is the border between the cantons of Uri and Ticino; after another , the tunnel ends at the southern portal near Airolo. The journey takes about 13 minutes by car, the maximum speed being .

The Gotthard Road Tunnel is one of the three tunnels that connect the Swiss Plateau to southern Switzerland and run under the Gotthard Massif, the two other being railway tunnels, the Gotthard Tunnel (1882) and the Gotthard Base Tunnel (2016). All three tunnels bypass the Gotthard Pass, an important trade route since the 13th century.

History 
In response to the automobile boom in Switzerland and other things, the Swiss government gave approval in July 1969 for the construction of the  Gotthard Road tunnel. The tunnel would be longer than any existing road tunnel, and would provide a year-round road link from the Swiss Plateau to southern Switzerland, and from northern to southern Europe as well, to be used in place of the Gotthard Pass. The tunnel was built roughly parallel to the old railway tunnel, with portals a few hundred metres away from those of the railway. Prior to the opening of the tunnel, cars were transported through the nearby railway tunnel on car shuttle trains. Following the catastrophic fire in the road tunnel in 2001, car shuttle trains resumed operations for a few weeks.

The tunnel was opened on 5 September 1980. It remains a single bore tunnel with just one lane operating in each direction.

In March 2014, the Swiss Government approved a bill to allow the building of a second road tunnel. Construction was scheduled to start in 2020, with the cost estimated at almost .

2001 collision and fire 
On 24 October 2001, a collision of two trucks created a fire in the tunnel, killing eleven and injuring many more, the smoke and gases from the fires being the main cause of death. The tunnel was closed for two months after the accident for repair and cleaning, reopening 21 December 2001.
he fire, no more than 150 trucks per hour are allowed to enter the tunnel.

Rail tunnels 
The  Gotthard Rail Tunnel, close to but separate from the expressway tunnel, handles rail traffic on the north-south line in Switzerland.

It was built for the use of trains travelling from northern Switzerland to the Ticino area and beyond.

Road conditions 

The Gotthard Tunnel is the core and culminating point of the A2 motorway in Switzerland, running south from Basel through the tunnel down to Chiasso on the border with Italy. Traffic flows through only one tunnel, which carries traffic both ways, with each direction allocated one lane.

Heavily used, the tunnel often has traffic jams during peak holiday seasons over Easter and summer, on both the north and south ends. In contrast, another tunnel through the Alps, the San Bernardino road tunnel as part of the A13 in the canton of Graubünden further east, is relatively uncongested and shorter.

Second road tunnel proposals 
Construction on a second, parallel road tunnel was started. In first instance it was only built for safety: an escape route in case of accidents. This second tunnel can be built out to a full road tunnel, allowing four lanes of traffic. Efforts to do this have failed, blocked by political resistance. The Alpine Initiative "for the protection of the Alpine region from transit traffic", which raised barriers against road tunnel construction, was initially blocked by the Swiss Parliament. A February 1994 Alpine Initiative passed (with 52% of the vote), and Parliament upheld the referendum twice through the 1990s. The pro-tunnel Avanti Initiative brought a referendum to voters in February 2004, which was rejected (by 62.8%).

The Swiss government has decided to upgrade the second tunnel into a full road tunnel in order to allow for the necessary reconstruction of the first road tunnel. Once the works on the first tunnel are finished, the Swiss government plans to operate one single lane in each tunnel (northbound traffic in the newly constructed tunnel, southbound traffic in the renovated one) in order to maintain the current tunnel overall capacity, in compliance with the Swiss constitutional norm that forbids a further growth of the traffic capacity across the Alps. The reconstruction would have lasted for several years in any variant – one variant would push the traffic over the mountain pass, another proposed to load the vehicles onto trains with a new terminal, a third would close the tunnel for several months every year over time range of a decade. All of these have their drawbacks and the usage of the second tunnel was chosen as the best option to allow for the reconstruction. Further usage of both tunnels was subject to a popular referendum that was held in February 2016, where it was approved. The actual upgrade mining of the second road tunnel would last from 2020 to 2027 at a cost of 2.7 billion francs for the whole project including the following reconstruction of the first tunnel.

See also
 List of highest paved roads in Europe#Highest motorways

References

External links
 The official information page of the Gotthard Tunnel (in German and Italian, few pages also in English)
 More statistics and facts  (as well as info on a second expressway tunnel)

Road tunnels in Switzerland
Tunnels in the canton of Uri
Tunnels in Ticino
Tunnels completed in 1980
Ticino–Uri border
Tunnels in the Alps
1980 establishments in Switzerland
2001 fires in Europe
2001 disasters in Europe
October 2001 events in Europe
2001 disasters in Switzerland